Eric Puls (born July 4, 1971 in St. Louis, Missouri) is a retired American soccer midfielder who played two seasons in the German third division and nine in the USISL.  He was the head coach of the Reading Rage in 2001 and 2002.

Youth
Puls grew up in St. Louis, Missouri where he was a member of the 1988 Christian Brothers College High School Missouri State championship soccer team.  That year, he was also selected as an All State soccer player.  He then attended Syracuse University, playing on the men’s soccer team from 1989 to 1992. Puls holds the all-time record for most points as a freshman.  In addition to his school teams, Puls also played club soccer with the Busch Soccer Club until his graduation from High School.  He then played for the Scott Gallagher cup.

Professional
Following college, Puls moved to Germany to pursue a professional career.  He signed with SV Darmstadt 98 in the second Bundesliga before moving to Rot-Weiß Waldorf of the Regionalliga where he played from 1992 to 1994.  In 1995, he returned to St. Louis and signed with the St. Louis Knights in the USISL.  In February 1996, the Colorado Rapids selected Puls in the 12th round (112th overall) of the 1996 MLS Inaugural Player Draft.  On March 25, 1996, the Rapids released Puls during a pre-season roster reduction.  He then moved to the Reading Rage where he played from 1996 to 2003.  He was 1999, 2000 and 2003 All League.

Coaching
In 2001, Puls became a player-coach with the Reading Rage.  He held this position through the 2002 season.  In 2003, he founded F.C. Revolution, a youth club in Wyomissing, Pennsylvania. He played with the F.C. Reading Revolution men's team in the NPSL until 2011 in which he retired from playing soccer. Now, he spends his time as a coach and club president for Reading Rage.  He has "revolutionized" soccer by introducing the "Funnel Offense".  The Funnel Offense is a variation of the 4-3-3.  The layout is shaped like a triangle where the 3 forwards form a point at the head of the offense.  This revelatory game strategy has taken teams to a nationally ranked status.

References

External links
 F.C. Revolution profile

1971 births
Living people
American expatriate soccer players
American soccer coaches
American soccer players
National Premier Soccer League players
Reading United A.C. players
St. Louis Knights players
Syracuse Orange men's soccer players
Soccer players from Missouri
USISL players
USISL coaches
Association football midfielders
American expatriate soccer players in Germany
Association football player-managers
Colorado Rapids draft picks